Michael Garron Hospital (MGH), formerly Toronto East General Hospital (TEGH), is a community teaching hospital located at 825 Coxwell Avenue in East York, Toronto, Ontario, Canada.

Overview

In the 2019-2020 fiscal year, the Michael Garron Hospital had nearly 20,000 acute inpatient stays and more than 80,000 emergency visits, 265,000 outpatient visits and delivered 2,900 babies. MGH has 388 total beds, nearly 2,600 employees and 470 physicians and midwives on staff. It provides an extensive range of ambulatory (outpatient), inpatient and community-based programs and services.

Accreditation Canada awarded the hospital "Full Accreditation with no recommendations" immediately following its June 2009 survey. Those results placed MGH in the top five percent of hospitals.

As a community teaching hospital, MGH is affiliated with the University of Toronto Faculty of Medicine, the University of Toronto Bloomberg Faculty of Nursing and other educational institutions.

MGH is a designated Paediatric Centre for south-east Toronto for maternal, newborn and paediatric care and a partner hospital in the Child Health Network of the Greater Toronto area. MGH's Emergency Paediatric area has been formally affiliated with the Hospital for Sick Children since 2004. The child-centric ER opened its doors in 2010 to provide a quiet area, separate from the rest of the ER, with private, glass doored treatment rooms with toys and TVs. The staff in this area are all specially trained in paediatrics. This is the only ER of its kind in Toronto (other than Sick Kids). Funding for this new facility has been, and continues to be, provided - in part - by the public.

Approximately 3,500 babies are delivered annually at the hospital's Maternal Newborn and Child Health Centre, which provides Level II Maternity and Neonatal Care and is a regional paediatric centre of the Child Health Network of Toronto.

History

Michael Garron Hospital began operations in 1929 as Toronto East General Hospital when it opened as a 110-bed general hospital. A new wing was built approximately every decade.

This included expansion and renovation of the Emergency Department as well as the Haemotology & Oncology Clinic. The new Oncology Clinic on K2 opened in September 2008 and the ER in 2010.

On December 2, 2015, the hospital main campus was renamed Toronto East Health Network (Michael Garron Hospital) after a $50 million donation from Myron and Berna Garron.

Administration
The hospital's chief of staff is Dr. Ian Fraser and its president and CEO is Sarah Downey.

Services

 Ambulatory and Community Services
 Complex Continuing Care and Short-Term Rehabilitation
 Emergency
 Maternal/Newborn/Child
 Medicine
 Mental Health
 Pharmacy
 Surgery
 Diagnostic Imaging
 Laboratory Medicine

Sweat lodge
In August 2019, the hospital opened an Indigenous sweat lodge.

Future
A major redevelopment began in the summer of 2018 and is estimated to be completed by 2023. The first phase of the project is scheduled to be completed in 2021 and will see a new building on the south-west portion of the campus. It will be called The Ken and Marilyn Thomson Patient Care Centre, after receiving a $5 million gift from Ken and Marilyn's son, Peter. The Thomson family was named the richest family in Canada by Canadian Business in 2018. The new 8-storey facility will be fully wheelchair-accessible, and include ambulatory care clinics, in-patient beds and family space, as well as four levels of underground parking.

See also
 Joseph Henry Harris

References

External links

Michael Garron Hospital Foundation

Hospital buildings completed in 1929
Hospitals in Toronto
Hospitals affiliated with the University of Toronto
Hospitals established in 1929
Art Deco architecture in Canada
1929 establishments in Ontario